Towaco is a station on NJ Transit's Montclair-Boonton Line located between U.S. Route 202 and Whitehall Road in the eponymous neighborood of Montville Township, Morris County, New Jersey. The station opened as Whitehall in 1870 along the Boonton Branch of the Delaware, Lackawanna and Western Railroad, and assumed its current name in 1905.

History
The station was first opened by the Delaware, Lackawanna and Western Railroad as Whitehall. Renamed to Towaco in 1905, a new depot was built in 1924 by the railroad with help from architect F.G. Neiss. The depot replaced one built in the 1910s and demolished in 1970.  NJ Transit rebuilt the structure in 2000.

Station layout
The station has a single side platform on a single track, facing eastward. There are also two parking lots with 220 spots for free use. There is also a  brick shelter on the platform.

Bibliography

References

External links

 Station from Google Maps Street View

Railway stations in Morris County, New Jersey
Railway stations in the United States opened in 1870
NJ Transit Rail Operations stations
Former Delaware, Lackawanna and Western Railroad stations
1870 establishments in New Jersey